Juliusz Zulauf (August 20, 1891 – May 21, 1943) was a Polish Army brigadier general (generał brygady). A recipient of the Virtuti Militari, he fought with distinction during  World War I, the Polish-Ukrainian War, the Polish-Soviet War, and the 1939 invasion of Poland.

Juliusz Zulauf was born in Lwów, then the capital of Austro-Hungarian Galicia. In 1910, after graduating from a local gymnasium, he joined the Lwów University of Science and Technology. There, at the age of 18, he joined the Związek Walki Czynnej and the Związek Strzelecki. After the outbreak of The Great War, on September 1, 1914, he joined the Polish Legions. In 1915 he was promoted to first lieutenant and then to captain. He commanded a company of infantry in the 2nd Legions Infantry Regiment and then in 5th Infantry Regiment. Wounded in July 1916, during the battle of Opłowa he was taken prisoner of war by the Russians. However, Zulauf managed to escape from captivity and cross the front lines to rejoin the Polish Legions. After the Oath Crisis of 1917 he was drafted into the Austro-Hungarian Army.

After Poland was reestablished in 1918, Juliusz Zulauf returned to his hometown, where he joined the Polish Army and took part in the defence of Lwów during the Polish-Ukrainian War. On May 11, 1919, he was given the command of the Polish 4th Legions Infantry Regiment and took part in the opening stages of the Polish-Bolshevik War. Heavily wounded in August of that year, he quickly recovered. However, he did not reassume his former post and instead became the commanding officer of the garrison of Radom on October 1 of that year.

After the cease fire agreement, on March 23, 1921, he became a peacetime commander of the 28th Kaniów Rifles Infantry Regiment and, since September 28 of that year, commanding officer of the 19th Infantry Regiment. Promoted to colonel in 1923, between 1926 and 1927 Zulauf commanded the 3rd Infantry Regiment, only to be promoted to the commander of infantry of the 5th Infantry Division. He held that post until April 1930, when he was promoted to commanding officer of the prestigious Polish 2nd Legions Infantry Division stationed in Kielce. For his service on January 1, 1932, he was promoted to the rank of brigadier general. From 1937 on, he commanded the Lwów-based 5th Infantry Division and with that unit he was active during the Invasion of Poland. After heavy fighting, his division was reduced to only one regiment, but managed to break through to Warsaw and took part in the defence of the Polish capital as part of the Warszawa Army. From September 14, Zulauf commanded the eastern perimeter of Warsaw's defences, in the city's easternmost district, Praga.

After Warsaw's capitulation  (September 28), Zulauf was taken prisoner of war by the Germans. He died May 21, 1943 at Oflag VIIA in Murnau.

His daughter Irena has donated many of Zulauf's personal belongings to the Kielce municipal museum.

Honours and awards
 Gold Cross of the Virtuti Militari, also awarded the Silver Cross
 Commander's Cross of the Order of Polonia Restituta, also awarded the Officer's Cross
 Cross of Independence
 Cross of Valour - four times
 Gold Cross of Merit

External links

1891 births
1943 deaths
Military personnel from Lviv
People from the Kingdom of Galicia and Lodomeria
Polish Austro-Hungarians
Polish generals
Polish legionnaires (World War I)
Austro-Hungarian military personnel of World War I
Polish military personnel of World War II
World War II prisoners of war held by Germany
Recipients of the Gold Cross of the Virtuti Militari
Commanders of the Order of Polonia Restituta
Recipients of the Cross of Independence
Recipients of the Cross of Valour (Poland)
Recipients of the Gold Cross of Merit (Poland)
Polish prisoners of war
Polish people of German descent